Ira McDonald Hillary (born November 13, 1962) is a former professional American football player who played wide receiver for four seasons for the Cincinnati Bengals and Minnesota Vikings.

References

1962 births
American football wide receivers
Cincinnati Bengals players
Minnesota Vikings players
South Carolina Gamecocks football players
Living people
People from Edgefield, South Carolina
Cincinnati Rockers players